is a Japanese basketball player. She represented Japan in the basketball competition at the 2016 Summer Olympics.

References

Japanese women's basketball players
Basketball players at the 2016 Summer Olympics
Olympic basketball players of Japan
1991 births
Living people
Small forwards
21st-century Japanese women